This is a list of people who have served as Custos Rotulorum of the West Riding of Yorkshire.

 Sir Richard Lyster bef. 1544 – aft. 1547
 Sir Thomas Gargrave bef. 1558–1579
 Francis Wortley 1579–1583
 Sir Cotton Gargrave 1584–1588
 Sir John Savile bef. 1594–1616
 Sir Thomas Wentworth, 2nd Baronet 1616–1626
 Sir John Savile 1626–1630
 Thomas Wentworth, 1st Earl of Strafford 1630–1641
 Thomas Savile, 1st Viscount Savile 1641–1646
 Interregnum
 Thomas Fairfax, 3rd Lord Fairfax of Cameron 1660–1671
 George Villiers, 2nd Duke of Buckingham 1671–1679
 Richard Boyle, 1st Earl of Burlington 1679–1685
 vacant
 Lord Thomas Howard 1688–1689
 George Saville, 1st Marquess of Halifax 1689–1695
 vacant
 Charles Boyle, 2nd Earl of Burlington 1699–1704
For later custodes rotulorum, see Lord Lieutenant of the West Riding of Yorkshire.

References

Institute of Historical Research - Custodes Rotulorum 1544-1646
Institute of Historical Research - Custodes Rotulorum 1660-1828

Yorkshire
West Riding of Yorkshire